Family of Secrets is a book by Russ Baker. Published by Bloomsbury Press in 2008,, it describes alleged connections between the Bush family and the Central Intelligence Agency. The book asserts that President George H.W. Bush was linked to the Watergate scandal and the assassination of John F. Kennedy. Family of Secrets was poorly received by critics.

The book's allegations 
Baker was reportedly drawn to John F. Kennedy assassination conspiracy theories after discovering a report that George H. W. Bush could not remember where he was on November 22, 1963.

In the book he levels various charges of corruption at the Bush family, whom he ties into the entry of the United States into World War II, the formation of the CIA, the assassination of John F. Kennedy and the Watergate scandal.

According to Baker, the first President Bush became an intelligence agent in his teenage years and was later at the center of a plot to assassinate Kennedy that included his father, Prescott Bush, Vice President Lyndon B. Johnson, CIA Director Allen Dulles, Cuban and Russian exiles and emigrants, and various Texas oilmen. He also names Bob Woodward of The Washington Post as an intelligence agent who conspired with John Dean to remove President Richard Nixon from office for opposing the oil depletion allowance.

The book observes that when George H.W. Bush was at Phillips Academy his roommate was the nephew of George de Mohrenschildt, and that in later years, Bush and De Mohrenschildt fraternized in Dallas. In 1962, de Mohrenschildt befriended Lee Harvey Oswald. Baker also makes a connection between the Bushes and the Watergate scandal. He describes Watergate "not as a ham-handed act of political espionage but as a carefully orchestrated farce designed to take down President Richard Nixon".

Reviews 

In The Washington Post, reviewer Jamie Malanowski said that "by trying to explain everything, to create a unified field theory of American tragedy that has the Bushes as the key actors and beneficiaries, Baker exceeds his grasp." He said that "Baker is not content merely to raise uncomfortable questions; he has latched onto the Grand Theory of Bushativity, and he insists on pressing his case with evidence that will not bear the weight."

Malanowski said that every time Baker "reaches a gap in someone's means or motivation, he hops, skips and jumps across it as nimbly as a mountain goat. Such words as 'appears,' 'apparently,' 'likely,' 'seems,' 'seemingly' and 'in all likelihood' appear at many crucial junctures; there are more crutches in these pages than in the grotto at Lourdes."

Time magazine reviewer Lev Grossman called Baker "prodigiously industrious" but said the effort to frame Watergate as an effort to take down Nixon was "far-fetched".

In a Los Angeles Times review, Tim Rutten, a former media critic for the newspaper, excoriated the book as an example of paranoid literature described by Richard Hofstadter. He said that "if the paranoid style can be said to have a canon, his preposterous new book. ... surely deserves a place among its classics." Rutten called the book a "dispiriting tome" and said that the Kennedy assassination conspiracy, as recounted in the book, had "about as many people involved in the plot as there were on Omaha Beach." He said that "what makes Baker's book singularly offensive is the way he recklessly impugns, in the most disgusting possible way, the reputations not simply of men and women now dead, but of the living." Rutten said that the elder Bush is probably "libel proof" but "using the tissue of innuendo, illogical inference, circumstance and guilt by tenuous association -- as Baker does in this book -- to indict rhetorically anyone, let alone a former chief executive, of an infamous murder is a reprehensible calumny."

Investigative journalist Tim Weiner, winner of the Pulitzer Prize and author of CIA and FBI histories, said the book is "a carnival of conspiracy theory". He told Boston magazine in 2015 that Baker is "driven by the search for truth that drives reporters everywhere, but conspiracy theory in which there's a giant octopus that connects disparate events and provides a unified field theory explanation of otherwise disparate events is not either journalism or history."

In the 2019 anthology Conspiracies and Conspiracy Theories in American History, the authors observe that a CIA memo indicates that a "George Bush" was briefed on the Kennedy assassination. But the book describes as  "tenuous at best." Baker's claim that George H.W. Bush was connected to supposed CIA involvement in the assassination.

References

External links 

 
 russbaker.com, Baker's website

Books about George H. W. Bush
Books about George W. Bush
Conspiracy theories in the United States
2008 non-fiction books